

Events

Pre-1600
1373 – Julian of Norwich has visions of Jesus while suffering from a life-threatening illness, visions which are later described and interpreted in her book Revelations of Divine Love.
1501 – Amerigo Vespucci, this time under Portuguese flag, set sail for western lands. 
1568 – Mary Queen of Scots is defeated at the Battle of Langside, part of the civil war between Queen Mary and the supporters of her son, James VI.

1601–1900
1612 – Sword duel between Miyamoto Musashi and Sasaki Kojiro on the shores of Ganryū Island. Kojiro dies at the end.
1619 – Dutch statesman Johan van Oldenbarnevelt is executed in The Hague after being convicted of treason.
1654 – A Venetian fleet under Admiral Cort Adeler breaks through a line of galleys and defeats the Turkish navy.
1779 – War of the Bavarian Succession: Russian and French mediators at the Congress of Teschen negotiate an end to the war. In the agreement Austria receives the part of its territory that was taken from it (the Innviertel).
1780 – The Cumberland Compact is signed by leaders of the settlers in the Cumberland River area of what would become the U.S. state of Tennessee, providing for democratic government and a formal system of justice.
1804 – Forces sent by Yusuf Karamanli of Tripoli to retake Derna from the Americans attack the city.
1830 – Ecuador gains its independence from Gran Colombia.
1846 – Mexican–American War: The United States declares war on the Federal Republic of Mexico following a dispute over the American annexation of the Republic of Texas and a Mexican military incursion.
1861 – American Civil War: Queen Victoria of the United Kingdom issues a "proclamation of neutrality" which recognizes the Confederacy as having belligerent rights.
  1861   – The Great Comet of 1861 is discovered by John Tebbutt of Windsor, New South Wales, Australia.
  1861   – Pakistan's (then a part of British India) first railway line  opens, from Karachi to Kotri.
1862 – The , a steamer and gunship, steals through Confederate lines and is passed to the Union, by a southern slave, Robert Smalls, who later was officially appointed as captain, becoming the first black man to command a United States ship.
1888 – With the passage of the Lei Áurea ("Golden Law"), the Empire of Brazil abolishes slavery.

1901–present
1912 – The Royal Flying Corps, the forerunner of the Royal Air Force, is established in the United Kingdom.
1917 – Three children report the first apparition of Our Lady of Fátima in Fátima, Portugal.
1940 – World War II: Germany's conquest of France begins, as the German army crosses the Meuse. Winston Churchill makes his "blood, toil, tears, and sweat" speech to the House of Commons.
1941 – World War II: Yugoslav royal colonel Dragoljub Mihailović starts fighting against German occupation troops, beginning the Serbian resistance.
1943 – World War II: Operations Vulcan and Strike force the surrender of the last Axis troops in Tunisia.
1945 – World War II: Yevgeny Khaldei's photograph Raising a Flag over the Reichstag is published in Ogonyok magazine.
1948 – Arab–Israeli War: The Kfar Etzion massacre occurs, a day prior to the Israeli Declaration of Independence.
1950 – The inaugural Formula One World Championship race takes place at Silverstone Circuit. The race was won by Giuseppe Farina, who would go on to become the inaugural champion that year.
1951 – The 400th anniversary of the founding of the National University of San Marcos is commemorated by the opening of the first large-capacity stadium in Peru.
1952 – The Rajya Sabha, the upper house of the Parliament of India, holds its first sitting.
1954 – The anti-National Service Riots, by Chinese middle school students in Singapore, take place.
1958 – During a visit to Caracas, Venezuela, the US Vice President Richard Nixon's car is attacked by anti-American demonstrators.
  1958   – May 1958 crisis: A group of French military officers lead a coup in Algiers demanding that a government of national unity be formed with Charles de Gaulle at its head in order to defend French control of Algeria.
1960 – Hundreds of University of California, Berkeley students congregate for the first day of protest against a visit by the House Committee on Un-American Activities.
1967 – Dr. Zakir Husain becomes the third President of India. He is the first Muslim President of the Indian Union. He holds this position until August 24, 1969.
1969 – May 13 Incident involving sectarian violence in Kuala Lumpur, Malaysia.
1971 – Over 900 unarmed Bengali Hindus are murdered in the Demra massacre.
1972 – A fire occurs in the Sennichi Department Store in Osaka, Japan. Blocked exits and non-functional elevators result in 118 fatalities (many victims leaping to their deaths).
  1972   – The Troubles: A car bombing outside a crowded pub in Belfast sparks a two-day gun battle involving the Provisional IRA, Ulster Volunteer Force and British Army. Seven people are killed and over 66 injured.
1980 – An F3 tornado hits Kalamazoo County, Michigan.  President Jimmy Carter declares it a federal disaster area.
1981 – Mehmet Ali Ağca attempts to assassinate Pope John Paul II in St. Peter's Square in Rome. The Pope is rushed to the Agostino Gemelli University Polyclinic to undergo emergency surgery and survives.
1985 – Police bombed MOVE headquarters in Philadelphia, killing six adults and five children, and destroying the homes of 250 city residents.
1989 – Large groups of students occupy Tiananmen Square and begin a hunger strike.
1990 – The Dinamo–Red Star riot took place at Maksimir Stadium in Zagreb, Croatia between the Bad Blue Boys (fans of Dinamo Zagreb) and the Delije (fans of Red Star Belgrade).
1992 – Li Hongzhi gives the first public lecture on Falun Gong in Changchun, People's Republic of China.
1995 – Alison Hargreaves, a 33-year-old British mother, becomes the first woman to conquer Everest without oxygen or the help of sherpas.
1996 – Severe thunderstorms and a tornado in Bangladesh kill 600 people.
1998 – Race riots break out in Jakarta, Indonesia, where shops owned by Indonesians of Chinese descent are looted and women raped.
  1998   – India carries out two nuclear weapon tests at Pokhran, following the three conducted on May 11. The United States and Japan impose economic sanctions on India.
2005 – Andijan uprising, Uzbekistan; Troops open fire on crowds of protestors after a prison break; at least 187 people were killed according to official estimates.
2006 – São Paulo violence: Rebellions occur in several prisons in Brazil.
2011 – Two bombs explode in the Charsadda District of Pakistan killing 98 people and wounding 140 others.
2012 – Forty-nine dismembered bodies are discovered by Mexican authorities on Mexican Federal Highway 40. 
2013 – American physician Kermit Gosnell is found guilty in Pennsylvania of murdering three infants born alive during attempted abortions, involuntary manslaughter of a woman during an abortion procedure, and other charges.
2014 – An explosion at an underground coal mine in southwest Turkey kills 301 miners.

Births

Pre-1600
1024 – Hugh of Cluny, French abbot and saint (d. 1109)
1179 – Theobald III, Count of Champagne (d. 1201)
1221 – Alexander Nevsky, Russian prince and saint (d. 1263)
1254 – Marie of Brabant, Queen of France (d. 1321)
1453 – Mary Stewart, Countess of Arran, Scottish princess (d. 1488)
1588 – Ole Worm, Danish physician and historian (d. 1654)
1597 – Cornelis Schut, Flemish painter, draughtsman and engraver (d. 1655)

1601–1900
1638 – Richard Simon, French priest and scholar (d. 1712)
1699 – Sebastião José de Carvalho e Melo, 1st Marquis of Pombal, Portuguese politician, Prime Minister of Portugal (d. 1782)
1712 – Count Johann Hartwig Ernst von Bernstorff, Danish politician and diplomat (d. 1772)
1713 – Alexis Clairaut, French mathematician, astronomer, and geophysicist (d. 1765)
1717 – Maria Theresa, Archduchess, Queen, and Empress; Austrian wife of Francis I, Holy Roman Emperor (d. 1780)
1730 – Charles Watson-Wentworth, 2nd Marquess of Rockingham, English politician, Prime Minister of Great Britain (d. 1782)
1735 – Horace Coignet, French violinist and composer (d. 1821)
1742 – Maria Christina, Duchess of Teschen (d. 1798)
1753 – Lazare Carnot, French general, mathematician, and politician, French Minister of the Interior (d. 1823)
1792 – Pope Pius IX (d. 1878)
1794 – Louis Léopold Robert, French painter (d. 1835)
1795 – Gérard Paul Deshayes, French geologist and chronologist (d. 1875)
1804 – Per Gustaf Svinhufvud af Qvalstad, Swedo-Finnish treasurer of Tavastia province, manor host, and paternal grandfather of President P. E. Svinhufvud (d. 1866)
1811 – Juan Bautista Ceballos, President of Mexico (1853) (d. 1859)
1822 – Francis, Duke of Cádiz (d. 1902)
1830 – Zebulon Baird Vance, American colonel, lawyer, and politician, 37th Governor of North Carolina (d. 1894)
1832 – Juris Alunāns, Latvian philologist and author (d. 1864)
1840 – Alphonse Daudet, French author, poet, and playwright (d. 1897)
1842 – Arthur Sullivan, English composer (d. 1900)
1853 – Vaiben Louis Solomon, Australian politician, 21st Premier of South Australia (d. 1908)
1856 – Tom O'Rourke, American boxer and manager (d. 1938)
1857 – Ronald Ross, Indian-English physician and mathematician, Nobel Prize laureate (d. 1932)
1868 – Sumner Paine, American target shooter (d. 1904)
1869 – Mehmet Emin Yurdakul, Turkish writer (d. 1944)
1877 – Robert Hamilton, Scottish international footballer (d. 1948)
1881 – Lima Barreto, Brazilian journalist and author (d. 1922)
  1881   – Joe Forshaw, American runner (d. 1964)
1882 – Georges Braque, French painter and sculptor (d. 1963)
1883 – Georgios Papanikolaou, Greek-American pathologist, invented the pap smear (d. 1962)
1884 – Oskar Rosenfeld, Jewish-Austrian writer and Holocaust victim (d.1944) 
1885 – Mikiel Gonzi, Maltese archbishop (d. 1984)
1887 – Lorna Hodgkinson, Australian educator and educational psychologist (d. 1951)
1888 – Inge Lehmann, Danish seismologist and geophysicist (d. 1993)
1894 – Ásgeir Ásgeirsson, Icelandic politician, 2nd President of Iceland (d. 1972)
1895 – Nandor Fodor, Hungarian-American psychologist, parapsychologist, and author (d. 1964)

1901–present
1901 – Murilo Mendes, Brazilian poet and telegrapher (d. 1975)
1904 – Louis Duffus, Australian-South African cricketer and journalist (d. 1984)
1905 – Fakhruddin Ali Ahmed, Indian lawyer and politician, 5th President of India (d. 1977)
1907 – Daphne du Maurier, English novelist and playwright (d. 1989)
1908 – Eugen Kapp, Estonian composer and educator (d. 1996)
1909 – Ken Darby, American composer and conductor (d. 1992)
1911 – Robert Middleton, American actor (d. 1977)
  1911   – Maxine Sullivan, American singer and actress (d. 1987)
1912 – Gil Evans, Canadian-American pianist, composer, and bandleader (d. 1988)
  1912   – Judah Nadich, American colonel and rabbi (d. 2007)
1913 – Robert Dorning, English actor, singer, and dancer (d. 1989)
  1913   – Theo Helfrich, German racing driver (d. 1978)
  1913   – William R. Tolbert, Jr., Liberian politician, 20th President of Liberia (d. 1980)
1914 – Joe Louis, American boxer (d. 1981)
  1914   – Johnnie Wright, American singer-songwriter and guitarist (d. 2011)
  1914   – Antonia Ferrín Moreiras, Spanish mathematician, academic, and astronomer (d. 2009)
1916 – Sachidananda Routray, Indian Oriya-language poet (d. 2004)
1918 – Balasaraswati, Indian dancer and instructor (d. 1984)
  1918   – Gwyn Howells, Australian public servant (d. 1997)
1920 – Gareth Morris, English flute player (d. 2007)
1922 – Michael Ainsworth, English cricketer (d. 1978)
  1922   – Otl Aicher, German graphic designer and typographer (d. 1991)
  1922   – Bea Arthur, American actress and singer (d. 2009)
1923 – Ruth Adler Schnee, German-American textile designer and interior designer (d. 2023)
1924 – Theodore Mann, American director and producer (d. 2012)
  1924   – Harry Schwarz, South African anti-apartheid leader, lawyer, and Ambassador (d. 2010)
1927 – Archie Scott Brown, Scottish race car driver (d. 1958)
  1927   – Fred Hellerman, American folk singer-songwriter, guitarist, and producer (d. 2016) 
  1927   – Herbert Ross, American actor, director, and producer (d. 2001)
1928 – Enrique Bolaños, Nicaraguan politician, President of Nicaragua (d. 2021)
  1928   – Édouard Molinaro, French actor, director, producer, and screenwriter (d. 2013)
1929 – John Galvin, American general (d. 2015)
1930 – Mike Gravel, American lieutenant and politician (d. 2021)
  1930   – José Jiménez Lozano, Spanish journalist and author (d. 2020)
  1930   – Vernon Shaw, Dominican politician, 5th President of Dominica (d. 2013)
1931 – Jim Jones, American cult leader, founder of the Peoples Temple (d. 1978)
  1931   – Sydney Lipworth, South African-English lawyer, businessman, and philanthropist
1933 – John Roseboro, American baseball player and coach (d. 2002)
1934 – Ehud Netzer, Israeli archaeologist, architect, and academic (d. 2010)
  1934   – Leon Wagner, American baseball player and actor (d. 2004)
1935 – Dominic Cossa, American opera singer
  1935   – Jan Saudek, Czech photographer and painter
  1935   – Kája Saudek, Czech author and illustrator (d. 2015)
1936 – Bill Rompkey, Canadian educator and politician (d. 2017)
1937 – Trevor Baylis, English inventor, invented the wind-up radio (d. 2018)
  1937   – Roch Carrier, Canadian librarian and author
  1937   – Zohra Lampert, American actress
  1937   – Beverley Owen, American actress (d. 2019)
  1937   – Roger Zelazny, American author and poet (d. 1995)
1938 – Giuliano Amato, Italian academic and politician, 48th Prime Minister of Italy
  1938   – Laurent Beaudoin, Canadian businessman
  1938   – Anna Cropper, British actress (d. 2007)
  1938   – Francine Pascal, American author and playwright
  1938   – Buck Taylor, American actor
1939 – Hildrun Claus, German long jumper
  1939   – Peter Frenkel, German race walker and coach
  1939   – Harvey Keitel, American actor 
1940 – Bruce Chatwin, English author (d. 1989)
  1940   – Kōkichi Tsuburaya, Japanese runner (d. 1968)
1941 – Senta Berger, Austrian actress
  1941   – Joe Brown, English singer and musician
  1941   – Jody Conradt, American basketball player and coach
  1941   – Ritchie Valens, American singer-songwriter and guitarist (d. 1959)
1942 – Leighton Gage, American author (d. 2013)
  1942   – Roger Young, American director, producer, and screenwriter
1943 – Anthony Clarke, Baron Clarke of Stone-cum-Ebony, English lawyer and judge
  1943   – Kurt Trampedach, Danish painter and sculptor (d. 2013)
  1943   – Mary Wells, American singer-songwriter (d. 1992)
1944 – Sir Crispin Agnew, 11th Baronet, Scottish explorer, lawyer, and judge
  1944   – Robert L. Crawford Jr., American actor
  1944   – Carolyn Franklin, American R&B singer-songwriter (d. 1988)
  1944   – Armistead Maupin, American author, screenwriter, and actor
1945 – Lasse Berghagen, Swedish singer-songwriter, guitarist, and actor
  1945   – Magic Dick, American blues-rock harmonica, trumpet, and saxophone player
  1945   – Lou Marini, American saxophonist and composer 
1946 – Tim Pigott-Smith, English actor and author (d. 2017)
  1946   – Jean Rondeau, French race car driver and constructor (d. 1985)
  1946   – Marv Wolfman, American author
1947 – Charles Baxter, American novelist, essayist, and poet
  1947   – Edgar Burcksen, Dutch-American film editor
1948 – Sheila Jeffreys, English-Australian political scientist, author, and academic
  1948   – Dean Meminger, American basketball player and coach (d. 2013)
1949 – Jane Glover, English conductor and scholar
  1949   – Dale Snodgrass, United States Naval Aviator and air show performer (d. 2021) 
  1949   – Zoë Wanamaker, American-British actress
  1949   – Philip Kruse, Norwegian trumpeter and orchestra leader
1950 – Andy Cunningham, English actor (d. 2011)
  1950   – Danny Kirwan, English singer-songwriter and guitarist (d. 2018)
  1950   – Joe Johnston, American film director and effects artist
  1950   – Manning Marable, American author and academic (d. 2011)
  1950   – Bobby Valentine, American baseball player and manager
  1950   – Stevie Wonder, American singer-songwriter, pianist, and producer
1951 – Rosie Boycott, English journalist and author
  1951   – Sharon Sayles Belton, American politician, 45th Mayor of Minneapolis
  1951   – Anand Modak, Indian composer and director (d. 2014)
  1951   – Herman Philipse, Dutch philosopher and academic
  1951   – Selina Scott, English journalist, producer, and author
  1951   – Paul Thompson, English drummer 
1952 – John Kasich, American politician, 69th Governor of Ohio
  1952   – Mary Walsh, Canadian actress, producer, and screenwriter
  1952   – Londa Schiebinger, American academic and author
1953 – Zlatko Burić, Croat-Danish actor
  1953   – Gerry Sutcliffe, English politician, Vice-Chamberlain of the Household
  1953   – Harm Wiersma, Dutch draughts player and politician
  1953   – Ruth A. David, American electrical engineer
1954 – Johnny Logan, Australian-Irish singer-songwriter and guitarist
1956 – Richard Madeley, English journalist and author
  1956   – Fred Melamed, American actor
  1956   – Kailash Vijayvargiya, National General Secretary of Bhartiya Janta Party
1957 – Alan Ball, American director, producer, and screenwriter
  1957   – David Hill, English organist and conductor
  1957   – Mar Roxas, Filipino economist and politician, 24th Secretary of the Interior and Local Government
1958 – Anthony Ray Parker, American actor
1961 – Siobhan Fallon Hogan, American actress
  1961   – Dennis Rodman, American basketball player, wrestler, and actor
1962 – Paul Burstow, English politician
  1962   – Nick Hurd, English businessman and politician, Minister for Civil Society
1963 – Andrea Leadsom, English politician
  1963   – Wally Masur, Australian tennis player, coach, and sportscaster
1964 – Stephen Colbert, American comedian and talk show host
  1964   – Chris Maitland, English drummer 
  1964   – Tom Verica, American actor, television director, and producer
1965 – José Antonio Delgado, Venezuelan mountaineer (d. 2006)
  1965   – Tasmin Little, English violinist and educator
  1965   – János Marozsán, Hungarian footballer
  1965   – Hikari Ōta, Japanese comedian and actor
  1965   – José Rijo, Dominican baseball player
  1965   – Lari White, American singer-songwriter, producer, and actress (d. 2018)
1966 – Alison Goldfrapp, English singer-songwriter and producer
  1966   – Darius Rucker, American singer-songwriter and guitarist 
1967 – Tish Cyrus, American actress and film producer
  1967   – Shon Greenblatt, American actor
  1967   – Tommy Gunn, pornographic actor
  1967   – Chuck Schuldiner, American singer-songwriter and guitarist (d. 2001)
  1967   – Melanie Thornton, American-German singer (d. 2001)
1968 – Miguel Ángel Blanco, Spanish politician (d. 1997)
  1968   – Susan Floyd, American actress
  1968   – Scott Morrison, Australian politician, 30th Prime Minister of Australia
  1968   – PMD, American rapper 
  1968   – Dmitriy Shevchenko, Russian discus thrower and coach
1969 – Buckethead, American guitarist and songwriter 
  1969   – Nikos Aliagas, French-Greek journalist and television host
1970 – Doug Evans, American football player
  1970   – Robert Maćkowiak, Polish sprinter
1971 – Imogen Boorman, English actress and martial artist
  1971   – Rob Fredrickson, American football player
  1971   – Espen Lind, Norwegian singer-songwriter, guitarist, and producer 
  1971   – Tom Nalen, American football player and sportscaster
1972 – Stefaan Maene, Belgian swimmer
  1972   – Darryl Sydor, Canadian ice hockey player and coach
  1972   – Pieta van Dishoeck, Dutch rower
1973 – Eric Lewis, American pianist
  1973   – Bridgett Riley, American boxer and stuntwoman
1975 – Jamie Allison, Canadian ice hockey player
  1975   – Cristian Bezzi, Italian rugby player and coach
  1975   – Brian Geraghty, American actor
1976 – Mark Delaney, Welsh footballer and manager
  1976   – Trajan Langdon, American basketball player and scout
  1976   – Ana Popović, Serbian-American singer-songwriter and guitarist
  1976   – Magdalena Walach, Polish actress
1977 – Ilse DeLange, Dutch singer-songwriter 
  1977   – Anthony Q. Farrell, Canadian-American actor and screenwriter
  1977   – Robby Hammock, American baseball player and coach
  1977   – Neil Hopkins, American actor, producer, and screenwriter
  1977   – James Middlebrook, English cricketer
  1977   – Samantha Morton, English actress and director
  1977   – Brian Thomas Smith, American actor and producer
  1977   – Pusha T, American rapper 
1978 – Brooke Anderson, American journalist
  1978   – Mike Bibby, American basketball player and coach
  1978   – Ryan Bukvich, American baseball player
  1978   – Germán Magariños, Argentinian actor, director, producer, and screenwriter
  1978   – Dilshan Vitharana, Sri Lankan cricketer
  1978   – Barry Zito, American baseball player
  1978   – Nuwan Zoysa, Sri Lankan cricketer
1979 – Prince Carl Philip, Duke of Värmland
  1979   – Steve Mildenhall, English footballer
  1979   – Vyacheslav Shevchuk, Ukrainian footballer
  1980   – L. J. Smith, American football player
1981 – Luciana Berger, English politician
  1981   – Nicolas Jeanjean, French rugby player
  1981   – Sunny Leone, Canadian American actress, model, and pornstar
  1981   – Michael Mantenuto, American actor (d. 2017)
  1981   – Shaun Phillips, American football player
  1981   – Ryan Piers Williams, American actor and film director
1982 – Albert Crusat, Spanish footballer
  1982   – Larry Fonacier, Filipino basketball player
  1982   – Oguchi Onyewu, American soccer player
1983 – Natalie Cassidy, English actress and singer
  1983   – Anita Görbicz, Hungarian handball player
  1983   – Johnny Hoogerland, Dutch cyclist
  1983   – Grégory Lemarchal, French singer (d. 2007)
  1983   – Jacob Reynolds, American actor, producer, and screenwriter
  1983   – Yaya Touré, Ivorian footballer
1984 – J. B. Cox, American baseball player
  1984   – Benny Dayal, Indian singer 
  1984   – Dawn Harper, American hurdler
  1984   – Caroline Rotich, Kenyan runner
1985 – Javier Balboa, Spanish-Equatoguinean footballer
  1985   – Jaroslav Halák, Slovak ice hockey player
  1985   – David Hernandez, American baseball player
  1985   – Carolina Luján, Argentine chess player
  1985   – Iwan Rheon, Welsh actor and singer
  1985   – Travis Zajac, Canadian ice hockey player
1986 – Lena Dunham, American actress, director, and screenwriter
  1986   – Eun-Hee Ji, South Korean golfer
  1986   – Robert Pattinson, English actor
  1986   – Alexander Rybak, Belarusian-Norwegian singer-songwriter, violinist, and actor
  1986   – Scott Sutter, English footballer
  1986   – Nino Schurter, Swiss cyclist
  1986   – Kris Versteeg, Canadian ice hockey player
1987 – Antonio Adán, Spanish footballer
  1987   – Hugo Becker, French actor
  1987   – Matt Doyle, American actor and singer
  1987   – Laura Izibor, Irish singer-songwriter, pianist, and producer
  1987   – Candice King, American singer-songwriter and actress
  1987   – Sandro Mareco, Argentine chess player
  1987   – Hunter Parrish, American actor and singer
  1987   – Marianne Vos, Dutch cyclist
  1987   – Charlotte Wessels, Dutch singer-songwriter
  1987   – Bobby Shuttleworth, American soccer player
1988 – Paulo Avelino, Filipino actor and singer
  1988   – Casey Donovan, Australian singer-songwriter
1989 – P. K. Subban, Canadian ice hockey player
1990 – Mychal Givens, American baseball player
1991 – Jen Beattie, Scottish footballer
  1991   – Anders Fannemel, Norwegian ski jumper
1992 – Bill Arnold, American ice hockey player
  1992   – Willson Contreras, Venezuelan baseball player
  1992   – Josh Papalii, New Zealand-Australian rugby league player
  1992   – Georgina García Pérez, Spanish tennis player
1993 – Stefan Kraft, Austrian ski jumper
  1993   – Debby Ryan, American actress and singer
  1993   – Romelu Lukaku, Belgian footballer
  1993   – Siim-Tanel Sammelselg, Estonian ski jumper
  1993   – Tones and I, Australian singer-songwriter
  1993   – Morgan Wallen, American singer-songwriter 
1994 – Łukasz Moneta, Polish footballer
1997 – Reimis Smith, Australian rugby league player

Deaths

Pre-1600
 189 – Emperor Ling of Han, Chinese emperor (b. 156)
1112 – Ulric II, Margrave of Carniola 
1176 – Matthias I, Duke of Lorraine (b. 1119)
1285 – Robert de Ros, 1st Baron de Ros
1312 – Theobald II, Duke of Lorraine (b. 1263)
1573 – Takeda Shingen, Japanese daimyō (b. 1521)

1601–1900
1612 – Sasaki Kojirō, Japanese master swordsman (b. 1575)
1619 – Johan van Oldenbarnevelt, Dutch politician (b. 1547)
1704 – Louis Bourdaloue, French preacher and author (b. 1632)
1726 – Francesco Antonio Pistocchi, Italian singer (b. 1659)
1782 – Daniel Solander, Swedish-English botanist and phycologist (b. 1736)
1807 – Eliphalet Dyer, American colonel, lawyer, and politician (b. 1721)
1809 – Beilby Porteus, English bishop (b. 1731)
1832 – Georges Cuvier, French zoologist and academic (b. 1769)
1835 – John Nash, English architect, designed the Royal Pavilion (b. 1752)
1866 – Nikolai Brashman, Czech-Russian mathematician and academic (b. 1796)
1878 – Joseph Henry, American physicist and academic (b. 1797)
1884 – Cyrus McCormick, American businessman, co-founded the International Harvester Company (b. 1809)
1885 – Friedrich Gustav Jakob Henle, German physician, pathologist, and anatomist (b. 1809)

1901–present
1903 – Apolinario Mabini, Filipino lawyer and politician, 1st Prime Minister of the Philippines (b. 1864)
1916 – Sholem Aleichem, Ukrainian-American author and playwright (b. 1859)
1921 – Jean Aicard, French author, poet, and playwright (b. 1848)
1926 – Libert H. Boeynaems, Belgian-American bishop (b. 1857)
1929 – Arthur Scherbius, German electrical engineer, invented the Enigma machine (b. 1878)
1930 – Fridtjof Nansen, Norwegian scientist, explorer, and academic, Nobel Prize laureate (b. 1861)
1938 – Charles Édouard Guillaume, Swiss-French physicist and academic, Nobel Prize laureate (b. 1861)
1941 – Frederick Christian, English cricketer (b. 1877)
  1941   – Ōnishiki Uichirō, Japanese sumo wrestler, the 26th Yokozuna (b. 1891)
1945 – Tubby Hall, American drummer (b. 1895)
1946 – Zara DuPont, American suffragist (b. 1869)
1947 – Sukanta Bhattacharya, Indian poet and playwright (b. 1926)
1948 – Kathleen Cavendish, Marchioness of Hartington (b. 1920)
1957 – Michael Fekete, Hungarian-Israeli mathematician and academic (b. 1886)
1961 – Gary Cooper, American actor (b. 1901)
1962 – Henry Trendley Dean, American dentist (b. 1893)
  1962   – Franz Kline, American painter and academic (b. 1910)
1963 – Alois Hudal, Austrian-Italian bishop (b. 1885)
1972 – Dan Blocker, American actor (b. 1928)
1974 – Jaime Torres Bodet, Mexican poet and diplomat (b. 1902)
  1974   – Arthur J. Burks, American colonel and author (b. 1898)
1975 – Bob Wills, American singer-songwriter and actor (b. 1905)
1977 – Mickey Spillane, American mobster (b. 1934)
1985 – Leatrice Joy, American actress (b. 1893)
  1985   – Richard Ellmann, American literary critic and biographer (b. 1918)
1988 – Chet Baker, American singer and trumpet player (b. 1929)
1992 – F. E. McWilliam, Irish sculptor (b. 1909)
1994 – Duncan Hamilton, Irish-English race car driver (b. 1920)
  1994   – John Swainson, Canadian-American jurist and politician, 42nd Governor of Michigan (b. 1925)
1995 – Hao Wang, Chinese-American logician, philosopher, and mathematician (b. 1921)
1999 – Abd al-Aziz ibn Baz, Saudi Arabian scholar and academic (b. 1910)
  1999   – Gene Sarazen, American golfer and journalist (b. 1902)
2000 – Paul Bartel, American actor, director, and screenwriter (b. 1938)
  2000   – Jumbo Tsuruta, Japanese wrestler (b. 1951)
2001 – Jason Miller, American actor and playwright (b. 1939)
2002 – Ruth Cracknell, Australian actress and author (b. 1925)
  2002   – Valeriy Lobanovskyi, Ukrainian footballer and manager (b. 1939)
2005 – Eddie Barclay, French record producer, founded Barclay Records (b. 1921)
  2005   – George Dantzig, American mathematician and academic (b. 1914)
2006 – Jaroslav Pelikan, American historian and scholar (b. 1923)
  2006   – Johnnie Wilder, Jr., American singer (b. 1949)
2008 – Saad Al-Salim Al-Sabah, Kuwaiti ruler, Emir of Kuwait (b. 1930)
  2008   – Ron Stone, American journalist and author (b. 1936)
2009 – Frank Aletter, American actor (b. 1926)
  2009   – Meir Brandsdorfer, Belgian rabbi (b. 1934)
  2009   – Achille Compagnoni, Italian skier and mountaineer (b. 1914)
2011 – Derek Boogaard, Canadian ice hockey player (b. 1982)
  2011   – Stephen De Staebler, American sculptor and educator (b. 1933)
  2011   – Wallace McCain, Canadian businessman, co-founded McCain Foods (b. 1930)
  2011   – Bruce Ricker, American director and producer (b. 1942)
2012 – Arsala Rahmani Daulat, Afghan politician (b. 1937)
  2012   – Donald "Duck" Dunn, American bass player, songwriter, and producer (b. 1941)
  2012   – Ada Maria Isasi-Diaz, Cuban-American theologian, author, and academic (b. 1943)
  2012   – Lee Richardson, English speedway rider (b. 1979)
  2012   – Don Ritchie, Australian humanitarian (b. 1925)
  2012   – Nguyễn Văn Thiện, Vietnamese bishop (b. 1906)
2013 – Joyce Brothers, American psychologist, author, and actress (b. 1927)
  2013   – Otto Herrigel, Namibian lawyer and politician (b. 1937)
  2013   – Jagdish Mali, Indian photographer (b. 1954)
  2013   – Chuck Muncie, American football player (b. 1953)
  2013   – Fyodor Tuvin, Russian footballer (b. 1973)
  2013   – Lynne Woolstencroft, Canadian politician (b. 1943)
2014 – David Malet Armstrong, Australian philosopher and author (b. 1926)
  2014   – Malik Bendjelloul, Swedish director and producer (b. 1977)
  2014   – J. F. Coleman, American soldier and pilot (b. 1918)
  2014   – Ron Stevens, Canadian lawyer and politician (b. 1949)
  2014   – Morning Glory Zell-Ravenheart, American occultist and author (b. 1948)
2015 – Earl Averill, Jr., American baseball player (b. 1931)
  2015   – Robert Drasnin, American clarinet player and composer (b. 1927)
  2015   – Nina Otkalenko, Russian runner (b. 1928)
  2015   – David Sackett, American-Canadian physician and academic (b. 1934)
  2015   – Gainan Saidkhuzhin, Russian cyclist (b. 1937) 
2018 – Margot Kidder, Canadian-American actress (b. 1948)
2019 – Doris Day, American singer and actress (b. 1922)
  2019   – Unita Blackwell, American civil rights activist and politician (b. 1933)
2022 – Khalifa bin Zayed Al Nahyan, 2nd President of the United Arab Emirates (b. 1948)

Holidays and observances
 Abbotsbury Garland Day (Dorset, England)
 Christian feast day:
 Our Lady of Fátima
 Gerard of Villamagna
 Glyceria
 John the Silent (Roman Catholic)
 Julian of Norwich (Roman Catholic)
 Frances Perkins (Episcopal Church (USA))
 Servatius
 May 13 (Eastern Orthodox liturgics)
 Rotuma Day (Rotuma)

References

External links

 BBC: On This Day
 
 Historical Events on May 13

Days of the year
May